Alto is an unincorporated community located in the town of Alto, Fond du Lac County, Wisconsin, United States.

Alto Fair
For two days every year in early August, the Alto 4-H club and Farm Bureau sponsor a county fair-style event. The Alto Fair starts on a Wednesday and ends the following day, allegedly because a weekend fair would discourage children from attending church services. The fair includes events such as 4-H judging, a tractor pull, and country breakfasts each morning of the fair.

Images

References

Unincorporated communities in Fond du Lac County, Wisconsin
Unincorporated communities in Wisconsin